Fools of Fashion is a 1926 silent society drama film directed by James C. McKay. It was produced and released by Tiffany Pictures.

Cast

Preservation
A print of Fools of Fashion survives in the BFI National Archive.

References

External links

1926 films
American silent feature films
Tiffany Pictures films
American black-and-white films
Silent American drama films
1926 drama films
Films directed by James C. McKay
1920s American films